A statue of  Chen Yi is installed in Chen Yi Square, along The Bund, in Shanghai, China.

External links
 

Monuments and memorials in China
Outdoor sculptures in Shanghai
Sculptures of men in China
Statues in China